Sail and Storm is written by Hanna Mina and was published by The House of Arts (Dar- Al-Adab). The novel was translated into Russian by Vladimir Shagal.

Plot
Sail and Storm is the story of a coastal Syrian city during WWII, in which the author depicted the impact of the war and the storms it left in a country occupied by the French, highlighting the contradictions that preyed on a heterogeneous society, but first and foremost, the story of seamen, the story of victory over nature, and the story of human will and adventure. The sea is not addressed in the Arabic novel without mentioning Hanna Minh, as if they are twins, which in fact they are, emanating from the Syrian coast's womb to crystallize eternal literature together through time.

Film
The director Ghassan Shmeit wrote and directed the screenplay, which was co-produced by the State Foundation for Film Production and the Cannes Film and Television Production Festival.

References

Syrian novels
Arabic-language novels
2006 novels